Zonites siphnicus is an extinct species of air-breathing land snail, a terrestrial pulmonate gastropod mollusk in the family Zonitidae.

Zonites siphnicus is considered to be extinct.

Distribution
This species was endemic to Cyclades Islands, Greece.

References

External links
 

S
Extinct gastropods
Endemic fauna of Greece
Molluscs of Europe
Molluscs of the Mediterranean Sea
Extinct invertebrates since 1500
Gastropods described in 1936